Ooperipatellus viridimaculatus is a species of velvet worm in the family Peripatopsidae. This species is oviparous, has 14 pairs of legs, ranges from 30 mm to 50 mm in length, and is brown or orange in color with two rows of green spots along its back. It is found in the South Island of New Zealand.

References

Onychophorans of Australasia
Onychophoran species
Animals described in 1990
Worms of New Zealand